Alex Caceres (born June 20, 1988) is an American mixed martial artist who competes in the featherweight division of the UFC. A professional MMA competitor since 2008, Caceres mostly competed in his regional circuit, before signing with the Ultimate Fighting Championships to appear on The Ultimate Fighter: Team GSP vs. Team Koscheck.  As of December 19, 2022, he is #15 in the UFC featherweight rankings.

Mixed martial arts career

Background
Caceres comes from Miami, Florida where he trains at Young Tigers Foundation. Caceres claims to be "inventive and creative" during the fights, often smiling during competition. Caceres also never went the distance in any of his fights prior to joining the TUF cast. Caceres' nickname, "Bruce Leeroy" stems from the character in the film The Last Dragon.

Early career
Caceres initially fought in an underground backyard street fighting organization in Miami. Caceres mostly appeared in promotions based in Florida. Amongst these was an appearance for the King of the Cage promotion at "King of the Cage: Hurricane" in February 2009. His opponent in that fight was Eric Kovarik, who was coming off multiple consecutive losses. In under two minutes, Caceres submitted his opponent with a rear naked choke.

Caceres then won his next fight against Joel Garcia in May 2009 via submission (triangle choke) early in the first round before going on a two-fight losing streak. These two losses were both by armbar, taking his record to 4-2 at that time.

In his final fight before joining The Ultimate Fighter, Caceres defeated Jahmal McLennan via TKO midway through the third round to snap his losing streak.

The Ultimate Fighter
Caceres then signed with the Ultimate Fighting Championship to appear on The Ultimate Fighter: Team GSP vs. Team Koscheck.

In the debut episode, Caceres faced Paul Barrow, who was 3-0 going into the show. Caceres, who smiled almost the entire fight, would go to defeat Barrow via submission (rear naked choke) in the first round.

In the second episode, Caceres was picked as GSP's fourth pick (eighth overall). Caceres competed in his preliminary round fight during this episode against Jeff Lentz. Prior to the fight, Lentz's cardio was called into question due to his smoking and drinking. However, Lentz went on to arguably win the first round of the fight against Caceres. Midway through the second round, Caceres locked in a triangle choke, forcing the tapout and advancing him into the quarter-finals.

In episode 8, Team GSP had to pick which team members would fight each other (considering they had 5 members in the quarter-finals). St. Pierre asked each member to pick the fighter they would prefer to fight. Both Caceres and Michael Johnson picked each other and they were scheduled to fight. Johnson defeated Caceres via unanimous decision (20-18, 20-18, 20-18) after two rounds in episode 10.

Ultimate Fighting Championship
Caceres made his official  debut in March 2011 against Mackens Semerzier at UFC Fight Night: Nogueira vs. Davis. He lost the fight via submission in the first round.

Caceres was expected to face Leonard Garcia August 14, 2011 at UFC Live: Hardy vs. Lytle. However, Garcia was forced out of the bout with an injury and replaced by promotional newcomer Jimy Hettes. Caceres was submitted with a rear naked choke at 3:12 of round 2.

Caceres then dropped to the bantamweight division and faced former WEC Bantamweight champion Cole Escovedo on November 12, 2011 at UFC on Fox 1. Caceres won via unanimous decision in a bout where he showed a vastly improved striking and ground game.

Caceres faced Edwin Figueroa on February 4, 2012 at UFC 143 but lost the fight in a split decision. Caceres was docked two points by referee Herb Dean for 2 groin strikes.

Caceres next faced Damacio Page on July 11, 2012 at UFC on Fuel TV: Munoz vs. Weidman. He won the fight via submission in the second round. The finish also earned him the Submission of the Night honors.

Caceres was expected to face promotional newcomer Kang Kyung-ho on November 10, 2012 at UFC on Fuel TV 6. However, Kang was forced out of the bout with an injury and was replaced by promotional newcomer Motonobu Tezuka. Caceres defeated the UFC newcomer by split decision.

The fight with Kang was rescheduled for March 3, 2013 at UFC on Fuel TV 8. Caceres won the back-and-forth fight via split decision. On March 20, 2013, it was announced that Caceres had failed his post fight drug test, testing positive for marijuana. Caceres was subsequently suspended for six months, retroactive to March 3, 2013 and his win over Kang was changed to a No Contest.

Caceres next faced Roland Delorme on September 21, 2013 at UFC 165. He displayed good striking skills and takedown defense, winning the fight via split decision.

Caceres was expected to face Mitch Gagnon on December 7, 2013 at UFC Fight Night 33.  However, the bout was scrapped during the week leading up to the event due to an alleged visa issue for Gagnon, restricting his entry to Australia.

Caceres faced Sergio Pettis on January 25, 2014 at UFC on Fox 10. He won the back-and-forth fight by rear-naked choke submission at 4:49 of the third round. The win also earned Caceres his first Fight of the Night and second Submission of the Night bonus awards.

For his tenth fight with the promotion, Caceres faced Urijah Faber at UFC 175 on July 5, 2014. He lost the fight via a rear-naked choke submission in the third round.

Caceres faced promotional newcomer Masanori Kanehara on September 20, 2014 at UFC Fight Night 52. He lost the fight via unanimous decision.

Cacares faced Francisco Rivera on June 6, 2015 at UFC Fight Night 68. He lost the fight via knockout in the first round, marking the first time he has ever been knocked out in his career.

Caceres faced Masio Fullen in a featherweight bout on January 30, 2016 at UFC on Fox 18. He won the fight via unanimous decision.

Caceres next faced Cole Miller on June 4, 2016 at UFC 199. He won the fight via unanimous decision.

Caceres faced Yair Rodríguez in the main event on August 6, 2016 at UFC Fight Night 92. He lost the fight by split decision. The fight was named Fight of the Night and both fighters were awarded a $50,000 bonus.

Caceres would next face Jason Knight on January 28, 2017 at UFC on Fox 23. He lost by submission in the second round.

Caceres faced promotional newcomer Rolando Dy on June 17, 2017 at UFC Fight Night: Holm vs. Correia. Caceres came in strong in round one, knocking Dy off his feet. A brief timeout was called by the referee in round two to check Dy's eye and the fight continued. However, the referee halted the fight at the end of round two due to a doctor's recommendation regarding Dy's eye injury. Dy was noticeably upset by the decision of the referee and Caceres was awarded the win by TKO.

The bout with Wang Guan was rescheduled and eventually took place on November 25, 2017 at UFC Fight Night: Silva vs. Gastelum Caceres lost the back-and-forth fight via split decision.

Caceres was scheduled to face Artem Lobov on April 7, 2018 at UFC 223, but the fight was cancelled due to Lobov's involvement with the Team McGregor bus melee.

Caceres faced Martin Bravo on July 6, 2018 at The Ultimate Fighter 27 Finale. He won the fight via split decision. This win earned him the Fight of the Night award.

Caceres faced promotional newcomer Kron Gracie on February 17, 2019 at UFC on ESPN 1. He lost the fight via submission due to a rear-naked choke in the first round.

Caceres faced Steven Peterson on July 20, 2019 at UFC on ESPN 4. He won the fight via unanimous decision.

Caceres faced Chase Hooper on June 6, 2020 at UFC 250. He won the bout via unanimous decision.

Caceres was scheduled to face Giga Chikadze on August 29, 2020 at UFC Fight Night 175.  However, Chikadze withdrew from the bout due to tested positive for COVID-19 and he was briefly replaced by promotional newcomer Kevin Croom. Subsequently on the following day, Croom was removed and replaced by Austin Springer. At the weigh-ins, Springer weighed in at 151 pounds, five pounds over the featherweight non-title fight limit. The bout proceeded at catchweight and Springer was fined 30% of his purse which went to Caceres. Caceres won the fight by submission in the first round.

Caceres faced Kevin Croom on February 27, 2021 at UFC Fight Night: Rozenstruik vs. Gane. He won the fight via unanimous decision.

Caceres faced Seung Woo Choi on October 23, 2021 at UFC Fight Night 196. After surviving an early knockdown and illegal knee, Caceres went on to win the fight via rear-naked choke submission in round two.  This win earned him Performance of the Night award.

Caceres faced Sodiq Yusuff on March 12, 2022 at UFC Fight Night 203. Caceres lost the bout via unanimous decision.

Caceres faced Julian Erosa on December 17, 2022, at UFC Fight Night 216. He won the fight via technical knockout in round one. This win earned him the Performance of the Night award.

Caceres was scheduled to face Nate Landwehr on March 25, 2023 at UFC on ESPN 43. However, Caceres withdrew due to an undisclosed reason and was replaced by Austin Lingo.

Personal life

Growing up the son of a drug dealer, Caceres grew up in a less affluent neighborhood having a tough upbringing. When his father went to prison, he was molested by a rival drug dealer of his father's. These turmoils led his family to move to a more affluent suburb. He is Cuban and Dominican.

Caceres was influenced by the documentary Forks Over Knives. He has cut out dairy and processed meat from his diet but is not a vegan. He has an interest in spirituality.

Championships and achievements

Mixed martial arts
Ultimate Fighting Championship
Fight of the Night (Three times) 
Performance of the Night (Two times)
Submission of the Night (Two times) 

MMAJunkie.com
2014 January Submission of the Month vs. Sergio Pettis

Mixed martial arts record

|-
|Win
|align=center|20–13 (1)
|Julian Erosa
|TKO (head kick and punches)
|UFC Fight Night: Cannonier vs. Strickland
| 
|align=center|1
|align=center|3:04
|Las Vegas, Nevada, United States
|
|-
|Loss
|align=center|19–13 (1)
|Sodiq Yusuff
|Decision (unanimous)
|UFC Fight Night: Santos vs. Ankalaev
|
|align=center|3
|align=center|5:00
|Las Vegas, Nevada, United States
|
|-
|Win
|align=center|19–12 (1)
|Seung Woo Choi
|Submission (rear-naked choke)
|UFC Fight Night: Costa vs. Vettori
|
|align=center|2
|align=center|3:31
|Las Vegas, Nevada, United States
|
|-
|Win
|align=center|18–12 (1)
|Kevin Croom
|Decision (unanimous)
|UFC Fight Night: Rozenstruik vs. Gane
|
|align=center|3
|align=center|5:00
|Las Vegas, Nevada, United States
|
|-
|Win
|align=center|17–12 (1)
|Austin Springer
|Submission (rear-naked choke)
|UFC Fight Night: Smith vs. Rakić
|
|align=center|1
|align=center|3:38
|Las Vegas, Nevada, United States
|
|-
|Win
|align=center|16–12 (1)
|Chase Hooper
|Decision (unanimous)
|UFC 250
|
|align=center|3
|align=center|5:00
|Las Vegas, Nevada, United States
|
|-
|Win
|align=center|15–12 (1)
|Steven Peterson
|Decision (unanimous)
|UFC on ESPN: dos Anjos vs. Edwards
|
|align=center|3
|align=center|5:00
|San Antonio, Texas, United States
|
|-
|Loss
|align=center|14–12 (1)
|Kron Gracie
|Submission (rear-naked choke)
|UFC on ESPN: Ngannou vs. Velasquez
|
|align=center|1
|align=center|2:06
|Phoenix, Arizona, United States
|
|-
|Win
|align=center|14–11 (1)
|Martin Bravo
|Decision (split)
|The Ultimate Fighter: Undefeated Finale
|
|align=center|3
|align=center|5:00
|Las Vegas, Nevada, United States
|
|-
|Loss
|align=center|13–11 (1)
|Wang Guan
|Decision (split)
|UFC Fight Night: Bisping vs. Gastelum
|
|align=center|3
|align=center|5:00
|Shanghai, China
|
|-
|Win
|align=center|13–10 (1)
|Rolando Dy
|TKO (doctor stoppage)
|UFC Fight Night: Holm vs. Correia
|
|align=center|2
|align=center|5:00
|Kallang, Singapore
|
|-
|Loss
|align=center|12–10 (1)
|Jason Knight
|Submission (rear-naked choke)
|UFC on Fox: Shevchenko vs. Peña
|
|align=center|2
|align=center|4:21
|Denver, Colorado, United States
|
|-
|Loss
|align=center|12–9 (1)
|Yair Rodríguez
|Decision (split)
|UFC Fight Night: Rodríguez vs. Caceres
|
|align=center|5
|align=center|5:00
|Salt Lake City, Utah, United States
|
|-
|Win
|align=center|12–8 (1)
|Cole Miller
|Decision (unanimous)
|UFC 199
|
|align=center|3
|align=center|5:00
|Inglewood, California, United States
|
|-
|Win
|align=center|11–8 (1)
|Masio Fullen
|Decision (unanimous)
|UFC on Fox: Johnson vs. Bader
|
|align=center|3
|align=center|5:00
|Newark, New Jersey, United States
|
|-
|Loss
|align=center|10–8 (1)
|Francisco Rivera
|KO (punches)
|UFC Fight Night: Boetsch vs. Henderson
|
|align=center|1
|align=center|0:21
|New Orleans, Louisiana, United States
|
|-
|Loss
|align=center|10–7 (1)
|Masanori Kanehara
|Decision (unanimous)
|UFC Fight Night: Hunt vs. Nelson
|
|align=center|3
|align=center|5:00
|Saitama, Japan
|
|-
|Loss
|align=center|10–6 (1)
|Urijah Faber
|Submission (rear-naked choke)
|UFC 175
|
|align=center|3
|align=center|1:09
|Las Vegas, Nevada, United States
|
|-
|Win
|align=center|10–5 (1)
|Sergio Pettis
|Submission (rear-naked choke)
|UFC on Fox: Henderson vs. Thomson
|
|align=center|3
|align=center|4:39
|Chicago, Illinois, United States
|
|-
| Win
| align=center| 9–5 (1)
| Roland Delorme
| Decision (split)
| UFC 165
| 
| align=center| 3
| align=center| 5:00
| Toronto, Ontario, Canada
| 
|-
| NC
| align=center| 8–5 (1)
| Kang Kyung-ho
| NC (overturned) 
| UFC on Fuel TV: Silva vs. Stann
| 
| align=center| 3
| align=center| 5:00
| Saitama, Japan
| 
|-
| Win
| align=center| 8–5
| Motonobu Tezuka
| Decision (split)
| UFC on Fuel TV: Franklin vs. Le
| 
| align=center| 3
| align=center| 5:00
| Macau, SAR, China
| 
|-
| Win
| align=center| 7–5
| Damacio Page
| Submission (triangle choke)
| UFC on Fuel TV: Munoz vs. Weidman
| 
| align=center| 2
| align=center| 1:27
| San Jose, California, United States
| 
|-
| Loss
| align=center| 6–5
| Edwin Figueroa
| Decision (split)
| UFC 143
| 
| align=center| 3
| align=center| 5:00
| Las Vegas, Nevada, United States
| |
|-
| Win
| align=center| 6–4
| Cole Escovedo
| Decision (unanimous)
| UFC on Fox: Velasquez vs. dos Santos
| 
| align=center| 3
| align=center| 5:00
| Anaheim, California, United States
| 
|-
| Loss
| align=center| 5–4
| Jimy Hettes
| Submission (rear-naked choke)
| UFC Live: Hardy vs. Lytle
| 
| align=center| 2
| align=center| 3:12
| Milwaukee, Wisconsin, United States
| 
|-
| Loss
| align=center| 5–3
| Mackens Semerzier
| Submission (rear-naked choke)
| UFC Fight Night: Nogueira vs. Davis
| 
| align=center| 1
| align=center| 3:18
| Seattle, Washington, United States
| 
|-
| Win
| align=center| 5–2
| Ketema Jahmal McLennan
| TKO (punches)
| G-Force Fights: Bad Blood 3
| 
| align=center| 3
| align=center| 2:48
| Miami, Florida, United States
| 
|-
| Loss
| align=center| 4–2
| Matt McCook
| Submission (armbar)
| WFC: Battle of the Bay 8
| 
| align=center| 2
| align=center| 3:56
| Tampa, Florida, United States
| 
|-
| Loss
| align=center| 4–1
| Farkhad Sharipov
| Submission (armbar)
| Best of the Best
| 
| align=center| 3
| align=center| 3:01
| Columbus, Georgia, United States
| 
|-
| Win
| align=center| 4–0
| Joel Garcia
| Submission (triangle choke)
| XFN: Da Matta vs. Thorne
| 
| align=center| 1
| align=center| 1:05
| Fort Lauderdale, Florida, United States
| 
|-
| Win
| align=center| 3–0
| Eric Kovarik
| Submission (rear-naked choke)
| KOTC: Hurricane
| 
| align=center| 1
| align=center| 1:58
| Fort Lauderdale, Florida, United States
| 
|-
| Win
| align=center| 2–0
| Tulio Quintanilla
| TKO (punches)
| MFA: There Will Be Blood
| 
| align=center| 2
| align=center| 4:14
| Miami, Florida, United States
| 
|-
| Win
| align=center| 1–0
| Eric Luke
| Submission (armbar)
| G-Force Fights: Bad Blood 1	
| 
| align=center| 2
| align=center| 1:45
| Miami, Florida, United States
| 

| Loss
| align=center| 2–1
| Michael Johnson
| Decision (unanimous)
| rowspan=3|The Ultimate Fighter: Team GSP vs. Team Koscheck
|  (airdate)
| align=center| 2
| align=center| 5:00
| rowspan=3|Las Vegas, Nevada, United States
| 
|-
| Win
| align=center| 2–0
| Jeff Lentz
| Submission (triangle choke)
|  (airdate)
| align=center| 2
| align=center| 2:27
| 
|-
| Win
| align=center| 1–0
| Paul Barrow
| Submission (rear-naked choke)
|  (airdate)
| align=center| 1
| align=center| 3:55
|

Submission grappling record
{| class="wikitable sortable" style="font-size:80%; text-align:left;"
|-
| colspan=8 style="text-align:center;" | 3 Matches, 1 wins 1 Loss 1 draw
|-
!  Result
!  Rec.
!  Opponent
!  Method
!  text-center|  Event
!  Date
!  Location
|-
|Loss|| 1–1-1 || Pat Sabatini|| Submission (Rear Naked Choke)|| Fury Pro Grappling 6|| 30 December 2022||  Philadelphia, Pennsylvania, United States 
|-
|draw||1-0-1|| Clay Guida || Draw || Fury Pro Grappling 5|| August 27, 2022 ||  Philadelphia, Pennsylvania, United States
|-
|Win||1-0|| Eddy Torres || Submission (Rear naked Choke) || Fury Pro Grappling 3||December 30, 2021||   Philadelphia, Pennsylvania, United States
|-

See also

 List of current UFC fighters
 List of male mixed martial artists

References

External links

1988 births
Living people
American male mixed martial artists
Lightweight mixed martial artists
Featherweight mixed martial artists
Mixed martial artists utilizing Jeet Kune Do
Mixed martial artists utilizing Brazilian jiu-jitsu
Mixed martial artists from Florida
Doping cases in mixed martial arts
Ultimate Fighting Championship male fighters
American Jeet Kune Do practitioners
American practitioners of Brazilian jiu-jitsu
American sportspeople in doping cases
Sportspeople from Miami